The 2018 Seattle Reign FC season was the club's sixth season of play and their sixth season in the National Women's Soccer League, the top division of women's soccer in the United States. After finishing fifth in the league for two consecutive seasons, the Reign finished third to return to the playoffs, where they lost to Portland Thorns FC in the semi-final.

Vlatko Andonovski replaced Laura Harvey as head coach on November 7, 2017. Andonovski was previously the head coach of FC Kansas City.

This was ultimately the club's last season of their first stint in Seattle, as well as its last as Seattle Reign FC. During the 2018–19 offseason, the club's principal owners, Bill and Teresa Predmore, announced that the team would move to Tacoma, Washington for 2019 and beyond, rebranding as Reign FC. In addition, the team gained two new minority investors—the ownership group of the Tacoma Rainiers, a Triple-A Minor League Baseball team in the Pacific Coast League, and Adrian Hanauer, the principal owner of the region's Major League Soccer team, Seattle Sounders FC. Reign FC played in the Rainiers' home of Cheney Stadium. A new soccer stadium in Tacoma, already planned for the Sounders' USL Championship affiliate Tacoma Defiance, was expected to be built by 2021, with Reign FC to move in upon its completion. However, in December 2021, it was announced that the club would return to Seattle.

Club

Coaching staff

Current roster 
As of July 16, 2018.

Competitions 

All times are in PT unless otherwise noted.

Preseason

Regular season

Regular-season standings

Results summary

Results by round

Playoffs

Appearances and goals

Only players who have made appearances are listed.

|-
|colspan="14"|Goalkeepers:
|-

|-
|colspan="14"|Defenders:
|-

|-
|colspan="14"|Midfielders:
|-

|-
|colspan="14"|Forwards:
|-

|-
|colspan="14"|Players who left the club during the season:
|-

|-

Awards

The Best FIFA Women's Player
 Megan Rapinoe (nominee)

Ballon d'Or
 Megan Rapinoe (shortlisted)

ESPY Awards
 Best NWSL Player: Megan Rapinoe
 Best International Women's Soccer Player: Jodie Taylor (nominee)

The Guardian 100 Best Footballers in The World

 No. 10: Megan Rapinoe
 No. 36: Jodie Taylor
 No. 89: Nahomi Kawasumi

NWSL season awards

 Most Valuable Player: Megan Rapinoe (finalist)
 Goalkeeper of the Year: Lydia Williams (finalist)
 Coach of the Year: Vlatko Andonovski (finalist)
 Best XI: Megan Rapinoe
 Second XI: Steph Catley, Lydia Williams

Team season awards 
 Most Valuable Player: Megan Rapinoe
 Defender of the Year: Lauren Barnes
 Newcomer of the Year: Allie Long
 Golden Boot: Jodie Taylor (9)

NWSL Player of the Month

NWSL Team of the Month

NWSL Player of the Week

NWSL Goal of the Week

NWSL Save of the Week

Contract extensions

Transfers
For transfers in, dates listed are when the Reign FC officially signed the players to the roster. Transactions where only the rights to the players are acquired (e.g., draft picks) are not listed, and amateur call-ups are not considered official signings either. For transfers out, dates listed are when the Reign FC officially removed the players from its roster, not when they signed with another club. If a player later signed with another club, her new club will be noted, but the date listed here remains the one when she was officially removed from the Reign FC roster.

Transfers in

Draft picks 
Draft picks are not automatically signed to the team roster. Only those who are signed to a contract will be listed as transfers in. Only trades involving draft picks and executed on the days of the 2018 NWSL College Draft and the 2018 NWSL Dispersal Draft, respectively, will be listed in the notes.

Loans in

Transfers out

References

External links 
 

OL Reign seasons
Seattle Reign
2018 National Women's Soccer League season
American soccer clubs 2018 season
Seattle Reign